Sherman Independent School District is a public school district based in Sherman, Texas (USA).

In addition to Sherman, the district also serves the village of Knollwood. Sherman is the sister city of Denison, Texas.

In 2009, the school district was rated "academically acceptable" by the Texas Education Agency.

Schools
Secondary schools
 Grades 9-12: Sherman High School
 Grades 6-8: Piner Middle School
 Grades 6-8 Sherman Middle School
 Jefferson Learning Center

Grades PK-5
 Crutchfield Elementary School
 Fairview Elementary School
 Neblett Elementary School 
 Sory Elementary School 
 Wakefield Elementary School
 Washington Elementary School
 Dillingham Elementary School

Preschools
 Fred Douglass Early Childhood Center

References

External links

 

School districts in Grayson County, Texas